David Barnard Dupee (March 30, 1916 – November 18, 2008) was an American professional basketball player. He played in the National Basketball League in one game for the Oshkosh All-Stars during the 1938–39 season. In college, Dupee was an All-Big Ten Conference performer at Wisconsin, but transferred there after one year at Beloit College in which he played for the freshman basketball team.

References

1916 births
2008 deaths
American men's basketball players
Basketball players from Illinois
Beloit College alumni
Forwards (basketball)
Military personnel from Illinois
Oshkosh All-Stars players
People from Earlville, Illinois
People from Freeport, Illinois
Wisconsin Badgers men's basketball players